Sunrise in the Land of Milk and Honey is Cracker's eighth studio album. It was released on May 5, 2009 on 429 Records.  It is the final album to feature longtime drummer Frank Funaro and is notable for the contributions of many guest artists such as Adam Duritz, Patterson Hood and John Doe.

The song "Darling One" was originally released on the self-titled 1996 album by Susanna Hoffs. It was co-written with former Cracker member Davey Faragher in addition to Hoffs and David Lowery. "Friends" was originally released on Johnny Hickman's 2005 solo album Palmhenge. "Hey Bret (You Know What Time It Is)" refers to Brett Netson of Built To Spill

Track listing

Personnel

The following people contributed to Sunrise in the Land of Milk and Honey.

David Lowery – Vocals, Guitar, Keyboards.
Johnny Hickman – Guitar, Vocals, Harmonica, Keyboards.
Frank Funaro – Drums, Percussion. 
Sal Maida – Bass guitar.

Chart performance

References

2009 albums
Cracker (band) albums